Jōetsu (上越) may refer to:
 as Kami-Echigo (上越後):
 Jōetsu region, a geographical region in Niigata Prefecture
 Jōetsu, Niigata, a city in Niigata Prefecture, Japan
 Jōetsumyōkō Station, a railway station in Jōetsu, Niigata
 as Kōzuke (上野) and Echigo (越後):
 Jōetsu Line, a major rail line in Japan
 Jōetsu Shinkansen, a high-speed shinkansen railway line connecting Tokyo and Niigata